Wang Qiang (Wang Ch'iang; 王牆, also 王檣 and 王嬙), commonly known by her courtesy name Wang Zhaojun was known as one of the Four Beauties of ancient China. Born in Baoping Village, Zigui County (in current Hubei Province) in the Western Han dynasty (206 BC–8 AD), she was sent by Emperor Yuan to marry Chanyu Huhanye of the Xiongnu Empire in order to establish friendly relations with the Han dynasty through marriage.

In the most prevalent version of the "Four Beauties" legend, it is said that Wang Zhaojun left her hometown on horseback on a bright autumn morning and began a journey northward.  Along the way, the horse neighed, making Zhaojun extremely sad and unable to control her emotions.  As she sat on the saddle, she began to play sorrowful melodies on a pipa (a round-bodied lute that was later called ruanxian). A flock of geese flying southward heard the music, and saw the beautiful young woman riding the horse; they immediately forgot to flap their wings, and fell to the ground. From then on, Zhaojun acquired the nickname "fells geese" or "drops birds."

Life

Entering the harem
Wang was born to a prominent family of Baopin Village, Zigui County (now Zhaojun Village, Xingshan County, Hubei) in the south of the Western Han empire. As she was born when her father was very old, he regarded her as "a pearl in the palm". Wang Zhaojun was endowed with dazzling beauty with an extremely intelligent mind. She was adept in playing the pipa and also master of the ancient "Four Arts of the Chinese Scholar" – the guqin, go, calligraphy and Chinese painting.

In 36 BC, Emperor Yuan of Han chose his concubines from the whole state. Because of Wang's fame in the county, she was his first choice as concubine Nan County. Emperor Yuan issued an edict that Wang should enter his harem soon. Wang's father said that his daughter was too young to enter the harem, but could not violate the decree. Wang left her hometown and entered the harem of Emperor Yuan in early summer. According to the custom in the palace, when choosing a new wife, the Emperor was first presented with portraits of all the candidate women. It is said that because of Wang's confidence of beauty and temperament, she refused to bribe the artist Mao Yanshou as the other maids did. As a reprisal, Mao Yanshou painted a mole of widowed tears on Wang's portrait. As a result, during her time in the Lateral Courts, Wang Zhaojun was never visited by the Emperor and remained as a palace lady-in-waiting. Wang Zhaojun's portrait was either never viewed by the Emperor or was inaccurate, and therefore the Emperor overlooked her.

Departing for the frontier

In 33 BC, Huhanye visited Chang'an as part of the tributary system that existed between the Han and Xiongnu governments. He took the opportunity to request to become an imperial son-in-law, which is recorded by Lou Jingde.

Typically the daughter of a concubine would then be offered, but unwilling to honour Huhanye with a real princess, Emperor Yuan ordered that the plainest girl in the harem be selected. He asked for volunteers and promised to present her as his own daughter. The idea of leaving their homeland and comfortable life at court for the grasslands of the far and unknown north was abhorrent to most of the young women, but Wang Zhaojun accepted. When the matron of the harem sent her unflattering portrait to the Emperor, he merely glanced at it and nodded his approval. Only when summoned to court was Wang Zhaojun's beauty revealed.

The Emperor considered retracting his decision, but it was too late by then, and he regretfully presented Wang Zhaojun to Huhanye, who was delighted. Relations with the Xiongnu subsequently improved, and artist Mao Yanshou was subsequently executed for deceiving the Emperor.

Life with the Xiongnu
Wang Zhaojun became a favourite of Huhanye Chanyu, giving birth to two sons. Only one, Yituzhiyashi (伊屠智牙師), seems to have survived. They also had two daughters, Yun (雲) known as Subu Juci (须卜居次) and Dangyu Juci(当于居次). Yun was created Princess Yimuo and would later become a powerful figure in Xiongnu politics.

When Huhanye died in 31 BC, Wang Zhaojun requested to return to China. Emperor Cheng, however, ordered that she follow Xiongnu levirate custom and become the wife of the next Chanyu, the eldest brother (or her stepson, born by her husband's first wife) of her husband. In her new marriage, she had two daughters. Wang was honoured as Ninghu Yanzhi (寧胡閼氏 "Hu-Pacifying Chief-Consort").

Cultural legacy

Statistics show that there are about 700 poems and songs and 40 kinds of stories and folktales about Wang Zhaojun from more than 500 famous writers, both ancient (Shi Chong, Li Bai, Du Fu, Bai Juyi, Li Shangyin, Zhang Zhongsu, Cai Yong, Wang Anshi, Yelü Chucai) and modern (Guo Moruo, Cao Yu, Tian Han, Jian Bozan, Fei Xiaotong, Lao She, Chen Zhisui).

Literature
 Chapter novel: You Feng Qi Yuan
 Variety Plays (known as Zaju in China) in Yuan Dynasty: Han Gong Qiu'
 Biography in Ming Dynasty: He Rong Ji Han Shu, Xiongnu Zhuan (first known account of Wang Zhaojun)
 Qin Cao ("Principle of the Lute") by Cai Yong (c. 2nd century)
 Xijing Zaji ("Sundry Accounts of the Western Capital") (c. 3rd century)
 Han Gong Qiu ("The Autumn in the Palace of Han") by Ma Zhiyuan (c. 13th century)
 Wang Zhaojun by Guo Moruo (1923)
 Wang Zhaojun by Cao Yu (1978)
 Imperial Lady by Andre Norton and Susan Schwartz (1990)
 Chapter 3, "Naturalizing National Unity: Political Romance and the Chinese Nation," of The Mongols at China's Edge by Uradyn E. Bulag (2002) contains a detailed discussion of variants of the Wang Zhaojun legend.

Film, television and music
 Beyond The Great Wall (1964), Hong Kong film produced by Shaw Brothers. Linda Lin Dai played Wang Zhaojun.
 Wang Zhaojun (1984), Hong Kong TV series on Asia Television, supervised by Wang Ximei.
 Wang Zhaojun (1985), TV series by Hong Kong Asia Television Limited. Wei Qiuhua played Wang Zhaojun.
 Wang Zhaojun (1988), Taiwanese TV series on CTV, directed by Zhou You. Song Gangling played Wang Zhaojun.
 Wang Zhaojun (2005), TV series by China Central Television (CCTV) and China Television Media, Ltd. Yang Mi played Wang Zhaojun.
 Zhaojun Chu Sai (2006), TV series by China Central Television (CCTV). Li Caihua played Wang Zhaojun.
 "Wang Zhaojun", song by Yang Yang

See also

 Xi Shi
 Diaochan
 Yang Guifei

References

External links

 Hou Han Shu'' Chapter eighty nine Nan Xiong Nu Lie Zhuan
 Zhaojun cultural festival

Han dynasty imperial consorts
Xiongnu
1st-century BC Chinese people
Chinese ladies-in-waiting
1st-century BC Chinese women
Chinese concubines